Samuel E. Lifschultz (January 7, 1905 – December 25, 1951) was an American professional basketball coach for the Chicago Bruins, leading the franchise's first season in the United States' National Basketball League (NBL). He coached for just the 1939–40 season in which the team finished with record of 14–14. That squad's stars were rookies out of the Loyola University Chicago, Mike Novak and Wibs Kautz.

Lifschultz had also coached at Crane Tech School in Chicago, Illinois, junior college teams, and Lifschultz Fast Freight in the AAU.

He left coaching to pursue business interests full time.

Head coaching record

|-
| align="left" |Chicago
| align="left" |1939–40
| 28||14||14||||align="center" |3rd in Western||—||—||—||—|| align="center" |Missed playoffs
|-
|-class="sortbottom"
| align="center" colspan="2"|Total
| 28||14||14|||| ||—||—||—||—||

References

1905 births
1951 deaths
American men's basketball coaches
Basketball coaches from Illinois
Chicago Bruins coaches
High school basketball coaches in Illinois
Sportspeople from Chicago